Pinerolo Cathedral is a Roman Catholic cathedral in Pinerolo, Piedmont, Italy, dedicated to Saint Donatus of Arezzo.

It is the episcopal seat of the Diocese of Pinerolo.

References

Roman Catholic cathedrals in Italy
Cathedrals in Piedmont
Churches in the province of Turin
Buildings and structures in Pinerolo